Gerry’s Pacemakers, known until 2018 as Gerry and the Pacemakers, were a British beat group prominent in the 1960s Merseybeat scene. In common with the Beatles, they came from Liverpool, were managed by Brian Epstein, and were recorded by George Martin. Their early successes alongside the Beatles were instrumental in popularizing the Merseybeat sound and launching the wider British beat boom of the mid-1960s.

They were the first act to reach number one in the UK Singles Chart with their first three single releases: "How Do You Do It?", "I Like It" and "You'll Never Walk Alone". This record was not equalled for 20 years, until the mid-1980s success of fellow Liverpool band Frankie Goes to Hollywood. Another of their most famous songs, "Ferry Cross the Mersey", refers to the River Mersey, which flows past Liverpool, and was the title song for the film of the same name. The group also enjoyed some success in North America as part of the British Invasion with seven of their singles reaching the US top 40, the most popular being "Don't Let the Sun Catch You Crying".

History
Gerry Marsden formed the group in 1956 with his brother Fred, Les Chadwick, and Arthur McMahon. They rivalled the Beatles early in their career, playing in the same areas of Hamburg and Liverpool. McMahon (known as Arthur Mack) was replaced on piano by Les Maguire around 1961. The group's original name was Gerry Marsden and the Mars Bars, but they were forced to change this when the Mars Company, producers of the chocolate Mars bar, complained.

The band was the second to sign with Brian Epstein, who later signed them to Columbia Records (a sister label to the Beatles' label Parlophone under EMI). They began recording in January 1963 with "How Do You Do It?", a song written by Mitch Murray. The song was produced by George Martin and became a number one hit in the UK, the first by an Epstein-managed Liverpool group to achieve this on all charts. "How Do You Do It?" was also reluctantly recorded by the Beatles (they eventually convinced Martin to let them release their song "Love Me Do" as a single instead).

Gerry Marsden was quoted as saying:

Gerry and the Pacemakers' next two singles, Murray's "I Like It" and Rodgers and Hammerstein's "You'll Never Walk Alone", both also reached number one in the UK Singles Chart, the latter recorded instead of the Beatles' "Hello Little Girl". "You'll Never Walk Alone" had been a favourite of Marsden's since seeing Carousel when he was growing up. It quickly became the signature tune of Liverpool Football Club and, later, other sports teams around the world. The song remains a football anthem. The group narrowly missed a fourth consecutive number one when "I'm the One" was kept off the top spot for two weeks in February 1964 by fellow Liverpudlians The Searchers' "Needles and Pins".

Despite this early success, Gerry and the Pacemakers never had another number one single in the UK. Marsden began writing most of their songs, including "I'm the One", "It's Gonna Be All Right" and "Ferry Cross the Mersey", as well as their first and biggest US hit, "Don't Let the Sun Catch You Crying" (Laurie 3251), which peaked at No. 4.

The band also starred in the early 1965 film, Ferry Cross the Mersey for which Marsden wrote much of the soundtrack. The film is sometimes referred to as "Gerry and the Pacemakers' version of A Hard Day's Night". The title song was revived in 1989 as a charity single for an appeal in response to the Hillsborough football crowd disaster, giving Marsden – in association with other Liverpool stars, including Paul McCartney, Ringo Starr and Frankie Goes to Hollywood's Holly Johnson – another British number one.

In the US, their recordings were released by the small New York City record label Laurie in 1963, with which they issued four singles without success. When the Beatles broke through in January 1964, Laurie's next regular single release of "Don't Let the Sun Catch You Crying" (Laurie 3284) became a big hit and, during 1964, Laurie coupled "How Do You Do It?" with "You'll Never Walk Alone" (Laurie 3261), and "I Like It" with "Jambalaya (On the Bayou)" (Laurie 3271), with some success. They appeared in the landmark concert film T.A.M.I. Show, released in December 1964, performing alongside Chuck Berry.

By late 1965, their popularity was rapidly declining on both sides of the Atlantic. They disbanded sometime in early to mid 1967, with much of their later recorded material never released in the UK. Gerry Marsden became a popular cabaret and children's TV entertainer. He and his pianist Jose McLaughlin reformed the Pacemakers in 1972 with fellow Liverpool musicians Billy Kinsley and Pete Clarke.

In April 1973, this second version of the group became the only Merseybeat band to ever record for the John Peel Show on BBC Radio. The tracks from that show have now been included on the album Gerry and the Pacemakers Live at the BBC, released on Parlophone Records in October 2018. Since then, Marsden occasionally toured with various line-ups of the band on the oldies circuit.

Drummer Freddie Marsden opened the Pacemaker driving school in Formby. He died on 9 December 2006 in Southport, age 66.

On 15 March 2017, Gerry Marsden collapsed onstage due to a sore knee while performing at a concert in Newport, Wales. After being helped offstage, Marsden did not return, but was quoted as saying the incident was "nothing serious".

Gerry Marsden announced his retirement on 29 November 2018, in order to spend more time with family, but, on 6 June 2019, to commemorate Liverpool's win against Tottenham in the Champions League, he surprised Take That fans by singing "You'll Never Walk Alone" at their show at Anfield.

Original bass player Les Chadwick died on 26 December 2019.

Gerry Marsden died on 3 January 2021.

Members
This is a partial list of band members.
Gerry Marsden –  lead vocals, guitar (1956–1966, 1972–2018; died 2021)
Les Chadwick – bass (1956–1966; died 2019)
Les Maguire – piano, backing vocals, harmony vocals (1961–1966)
Freddie Marsden – drums and backing vocals (1956–1966; died 2006)
Arthur (Mack) McMahon – piano (1956–1961)
Jose McLaughlin – piano, guitar, musical director (1970–1974)
Billy Kinsley – bass (The Merseybeats, Liverpool Express, Kinsleys, Rockin Horse)
Pete Clarke – drums (The Escorts)
Bill (Faron) Ruffley – 2nd vocalist of the band in Hamburg (Faron's Flamingos)

Discography

See also
 List of artists who reached number one on the UK Singles Chart
 List of artists by total number of UK number one singles
 List of Columbia Graphophone Company artists
 List of bands and artists from Merseyside
 List of performers on Top of the Pops

References

External links

 Official site
 Classic Bands history page
 
 Entry at 45cat.com
 
 Gerry and the Pacemakers fan site

English pop music groups
Musical groups from Liverpool
Beat groups
British Invasion artists
Musical groups established in 1956
Musical groups disestablished in 2018
Capitol Records artists
Columbia Graphophone Company artists
Laurie Records artists
1956 establishments in England
2018 disestablishments in England